Scalicus is a genus of marine ray-finned fish belonging to the family Peristediidae, the armoured gurnards or armored searobins.  These fishes are found in the Indo-Pacific region.

Taxonomy
Scalicus was first described as a monotypic genus in 1923 by the American ichthyologist David Starr Jordan with the newly described Peristedion amiscus,  designated as its type species. Within the family Peristediidae there are 2 clades, this genus is in the clade consisting of 5 genera, with the nominate genus Peristedion in the other clade. Jordan did not explain the genus name's etymology but it may be from skallo meaning "hoe", an allusion top the shovel shaped snout of the type species.

Species
Scalicus currently has 8 recognised species within it:
 Scalicus amiscus D. S. Jordan & Starks, 1904
 Scalicus engyceros Günther, 1872
 Scalicus gilberti D. S. Jordan, 1921 
 Scalicus hians C. H. Gilbert & Cramer, 1897
 Scalicus investigatoris Alcock, 1898
 Scalicus orientalis Fowler, 1938
 Scalicus paucibarbatus Kawai, 2019
 Scalicus quadratorostratus Fourmanoir & Rivaton, 1979
 Scalicus serrulatus Alcock, 1898

Some authorities recognise 6 valid species, treating S. amiscus as a junior synonym of S. hains and both S. gilberti and S, investigatoris as a junior synonyms of S. engyceros.

Characteristics
Scalicus armoured gurnards have no teeth in the upper jaw, a smooth lateral margin of the head. The rear pairs of the lower lateral rows of scutes are not joined to each other, The lower jaw has barbels which are not branched, apart from the rearmost barbels on the lip and chin. The number of soft rays in the second dorsal fin and the anal fin both exceed 19.

Distribution and habitat
Scalicus armoured gurnards are demersal, deep water fishes which are found in the Indian Ocean from the eastern costa of Africa to Hawaii.

References

Peristediidae

 
Taxa named by David Starr Jordan